Ghantous or Gantous or Ghantus is a surname. It may refer to:

Ghantous
Raad Ghantous, Iraqi-born Assyrian American interior designer

Ghantus
Ghantus Haddad, birth name of Gregory IV of Antioch, Greek Orthodox Patriarch of Antioch from 1906 to 1928

Gantous
Paul Gantous, member of Canadian indie band Then One Day